The Konetsgorskaya narrow-gauge railway is located in Arkhangelsk Oblast, Russia.

Current status 
The Konetsgorskaya forestry railway's first line was constructed in 1942, in the area of Vinogradovsky District, Arkhangelsk Oblast from the village Rochegda. The railway operates scheduled freight services from Rochegda, used for forestry tasks such as the transportation of felled logs and forestry workers. In 2015, repairs are being made to the track.

Rolling stock

Locomotives 
 TU7 – № 2304, 1710, 1331, 1437, 3290
 TU6A – № 3017, 3109
 TU6SPA – № 005
 TU8 – № 0012
 TD-5U "Pioneer"

Railroad cars 
 Boxcar
 Tank car
 Snowplow
 Dining car
 Passenger car
 DM-20 «Loglift»
 Railway log-car and Flatcar
 Hopper car to transport track ballast

Gallery

See also
Narrow-gauge railways in Russia

References and sources

External links

 Official website LZP Konetsgorsky
 Photo - project «Steam Engine» 
 «The site of the railroad» S. Bolashenko 
 Konetsgorskaya railway (interactive map)

750 mm gauge railways in Russia
Railway lines opened in 1942
Rail transport in Arkhangelsk Oblast
Logging railways in Russia
1942 establishments in the Soviet Union